is a Japanese judoka ranking at 5th Dan. She competed in the -70 kg division at the 2016 Olympics in Rio; she took gold, beating the world #1 and world #2 ranked women along the way.  She had previously competed in the 70 kg event at the 2012 Summer Olympics.

References

External links
 
 
 
 
 

1990 births
Living people
Japanese female judoka
Judoka at the 2012 Summer Olympics
Judoka at the 2016 Summer Olympics
Olympic judoka of Japan
Olympic gold medalists for Japan
Olympic medalists in judo
Medalists at the 2016 Summer Olympics
People from Toyama Prefecture
21st-century Japanese women